Meghan Christina Agosta (born February 12, 1987) is a Canadian women's ice hockey forward, who last played for the Montreal Stars of the Canadian Women's Hockey League. Agosta plays for the Canada women's national ice hockey team and is a gold (3) and silver medallist at the Winter Olympics of 2006 Turin, 2010 Vancouver, 2014 Sochi, and 2018 Pyeongchang Winter Olympics. At the 2010 Winter Olympics, Agosta was named MVP of the Women's Hockey Tournament. She is a multi-medallist at the Women's World Championships with two gold medals and six silvers. 
 
During the 2006–07 season at Mercyhurst College in NCAA Division I hockey, Agosta was the first freshman named as a finalist for the Patty Kazmaier Award. She was also named a First Team All-American and unanimously chosen for CHA Player of the Year. Agosta led the 2008–09 Mercyhurst Lakers to the finals of the NCAA women's hockey championship and as captain that season, earned numerous accolades, including being selected as a 2009 First Team All-American, a Patty Kazmaier Award Final Three, College Hockey America Player of the Year, the CHA Three-Star Player of the Year, to the CHA All-Tournament Team, and to the Frozen Four All-Tournament Team.

Hockey career

Minor
Agosta switched from figure skating to hockey at age 6. As a teenager, Agosta participated in AAA boys hockey with the Chatham-Kent Cyclones. With the Cyclones, Agosta was part of Alliance Championship teams. She later competed for the AA Windsor Wildcats of the Ontario Provincial Women's Hockey League. At the 2003 Canada Winter Games, her goal clinched the win for Team Ontario. A teammates was Haley Irwin. She was a gold medallist for Team Ontario Red at the National Under 18 championships in 2005. Agosta is an accomplished inline hockey player. She was a gold medallist for Canada at the 2004 World Inline Hockey Championship.

College
Agosta distinguished herself as at Mercyhurst College when a freshman in NCAA Division I hockey during the 2006–07 season. She became the first freshman ever to make the final three for the Patty Kazmaier Award. She was also a First Team All-American and a unanimous choice for CHA Player of the Year. She helped lead Mercyhurst to the NCAA quarterfinals and to its inaugural No. 1 national ranking. 

During the 2007–08 season, Agosta tied Krissy Wendell's one season record of 7 shorthanded goals. In the 2008–09 season, Agosta would tie Wendell's career mark of 16 shorthanded goals. She led the 2008–09 Mercyhurst Lakers women's ice hockey team to the finals of the NCAA women's hockey championship. She was captain of the Lakers that season, as she earned numerous accolades. These included being selected as a 2009 First Team All-American, a Patty Kazmaier Award Final Three, College Hockey America Player of the Year, CHA Three-Star Player of the Year, CHA All-Tournament Team, and the Frozen Four All-Tournament Team. For the month of October 2010 (her first month back to the NCAA), Agosta scored 10 goals and had 19 points. On January 21 and 22, Agosta recorded five points on two goals and three assists in a two-game sweep of Robert Morris. On January 21, she scored a goal and dished out two assists in a 6–3 win. The next day, she scored her 26th of the season while the Lakers were short-handed, and added an assist. On February 4, 2011, Meghan Agosta became the all-time leading scorer in NCAA women's hockey history with three goals and one assist in Mercyhurst College's 6–2 win over Wayne State. Wayne State goalie DeLayne Brian was the goaltender in net when Agosta broke the record. Agosta's four points gave her 286 career points, one more than ex-Harvard forward Julie Chiu's record of 285 set in 2006–07. Agosta, who also owns the record for most short-handed goals and game-winning goals, added three assists in the Lakers' 3–1 win over Wayne State on February 5. On February 25, 2011, Agosta scored her 151st career goal to become all-time leading goal scorer in NCAA history. She accomplished this in a 6–2 victory over the Robert Morris Colonials women's ice hockey program at the Mercyhurst Ice Center. She surpassed Harvard's Nicole Corriero, who set the record at 150 during the 2004–05 season. The goal was scored on the power play at 15:18 of the second period with the assist going to Bailey Bram. She later added her 152nd goal in the third period. Agosta was featured in Sports Illustrated's Faces in the Crowd feature in the February 21, 2011 issue (as recognition of becoming the all-time NCAA scorer). In 2011, Agosta was named CHA Player of the Year as well as a First Team All-CHA selection, marking the fourth time in her career she captured both accolades. On March 5, 2011, Agosta scored three goals in the CHA championship game. With the hat trick, she topped 300 points for her NCAA career as the Lakers defeated Syracuse 5–4 and captured its ninth straight College Hockey America title. On March 12, 2011, Agosta scored two goals in her final NCAA game, in what would be a 4–2 loss to the Boston university Terriers in the NCAA regional playoffs.

CWHL
In the 2011–12 season, Stars forward Agosta won the Angela James Bowl while breaking the league's single-season scoring record. Her 80 points (41 goals and 39 assists) broke the previous record of 69 points held by Jayna Hefford. By winning the 2012 Clarkson Cup, she became an unofficial member of the Triple Gold Club (the accomplishment by women is not yet officially recognized by the IIHF), as she became one of only five women to win the Clarkson Cup, a gold medal in Winter Olympics, and a gold medal at the IIHF World Women's Championships. She joined Caroline Ouellette, Jenny Potter, Kim St-Pierre, and Sarah Vaillancourt.

In the 2012–13 season, Agosta became the first two-winner of the Angela James Bowl.

International play
 Agosta was named to the 2018 Winter Olympics roster for Canada. At the Olympics, she won a silver medal after a 6-round shootout loss to the United States.
 Agosta was named to the 2014 Olympic roster for Canada. At the 2014 Winter Olympic Games, Meghan won her 3rd consecutive Olympic gold medal in a thrilling championship game with Canada scoring twice in the final 3 minutes to force overtime and then winning the game on a power play goal from Marie-Philip Poulin.
 With a little over two minutes left in the third period of the 2012 IIHF Women's World Championship, Agosta scored to tie the game at 4–4. She would assist on the game winner in overtime.
In the second game of the 2011 IIHF Eight Nations Tournament, Agosta registered a hat trick and added two assists in a 14–1 triumph over Russia. On August 31, 2011, Agosta scored a hat trick as Canada lost for just the second time in 66 all-time international meetings against Sweden by a 6–4 mark.
 On February 17, 2010, Agosta scored a record third Olympic hat-trick in the match against Sweden to move on to eight goals in this tournament, equalling Danielle Goyette's record for most goals in one Olympic tournament, set in 1998. Agosta went on to score 9 goals and 6 assists and two penalty minutes while helping Canada to a gold medal in the Vancouver Olympics. She was named tournament MVP at 2010 Winter Olympic Games.
On her 19th birthday, during the 2006 Winter Olympic Games in Turin, she scored a hat trick for Team Canada against the Russian national women's ice hockey team. She was the youngest member of Canada's gold medal winning team in Turin. 2006 Winter Olympic Games
In August 2004, she moved to Calgary to train with the national team. Agosta was an alternate for the team that finished second at the 2005 women's world championship in April. She played for the national team for the first time in August 2005 at the Four Nations Cup, and was one of the leading scorers during the exhibition phase prior to the Winter Olympics.

Personal life
Agosta grew up in an Italian household, in Ruthven, Ontario; a community of the town of Kingsville. She represented Canada at the 2006 World Inline Hockey Championship in Taylor, Michigan. She earned an assist in the gold medal game in a loss to the United States. Her parents' names are Nino and Char. She has three siblings, Kara, Jeric and Jade. Her brother Jeric received a full scholarship to play hockey at the University of Nebraska Omaha. She majored in criminal justice at Mercyhurst. On August 31, 2012, Agosta married Marco Marciano, the Canadian national women's team goaltending and video coach. Marciano is also the goaltending coach of the Blainville-Boisbriand Armada of the QMJHL.  Agosta separated from Marciano in the fall of 2014 and changed her name back to Agosta shortly thereafter.

In fall 2014, Agosta took a break from hockey and joined the Vancouver Police Department as a probationary constable.  Agosta graduated from the Vancouver Police Department Police Academy in May 2015.  Agosta took a year leave from the Vancouver Police Department to train and play with the Canadian national team.

Career statistics

Regular season and playoffs

International

Awards and honours

IIHF
Vancouver 2010 Olympics, Media All-Star Team
Vancouver 2010 Olympics, Directorate Award, Best Forward
Vancouver 2010 Olympics, Most Valuable Player, Women's Hockey Tournament

CWHL
CWHL Most Valuable Player, 2011-12
Angela James Bowl, 2011-12 and 2012-13
CWHL First All-Star Team, 2011-12 and 2012-13
CWHL All-Rookie Team, 2011-12

NCAA
College Hockey America, Player of the Month, October 2010
College Hockey America, Player of the Month, January 2011
CHA Player of the Year (2007–2009, 2011)
First Team All-CHA selection (2007–2009, 2011)
2011 CHA Tournament Most Valuable Player
 2011 First Team All-America selection
 Finalist, Patty Kazmaier Memorial Award (2007, 2008, 2009, 2011)

Other
Finalist for the Women's Sports Foundation's 2010 Sportswoman of the Year Team Award
2011 Top collegiate female athlete, 47th Annual Erie Charity Sports Banquet

See also
2006–07 Mercyhurst Lakers women's ice hockey season
2007–08 Mercyhurst Lakers women's ice hockey season
2008–09 Mercyhurst Lakers women's ice hockey season
2010–11 Mercyhurst Lakers women's ice hockey season
Ice hockey at the 2006 Winter Olympics
Ice hockey at the 2010 Winter Olympics
Ice hockey at the 2014 Winter Olympics

References

External links

 
 
 
 
 

1987 births
Canadian sportspeople of Italian descent
Canadian women's ice hockey forwards
Clarkson Cup champions
Canadian expatriate ice hockey players in the United States
Canadian women's national inline hockey team players
Ice hockey people from Ontario
Ice hockey players at the 2006 Winter Olympics
Ice hockey players at the 2010 Winter Olympics
Ice hockey players at the 2014 Winter Olympics
Ice hockey players at the 2018 Winter Olympics
Living people
Medalists at the 2006 Winter Olympics
Medalists at the 2010 Winter Olympics
Medalists at the 2014 Winter Olympics
Medalists at the 2018 Winter Olympics
Mercyhurst Lakers women's ice hockey players
Les Canadiennes de Montreal players
Olympic gold medalists for Canada
Olympic silver medalists for Canada
Olympic ice hockey players of Canada
Olympic medalists in ice hockey
Sportspeople from Windsor, Ontario
Canadian women police officers